Lisa Brennauer (born 8 June 1988) is a German former racing cyclist, who rode professionally between 2009 and 2022, for six different teams.

On the track, Brennauer won the gold medal at the 2020 Summer Olympics in the women's team pursuit with Mieke Kröger, Lisa Klein and Franziska Brauße, setting the new world record. She also won two gold medals at the 2021 UCI Track Cycling World Championships, and four gold medals over three different UEC European Track Championships. On the road, Brennauer formed part of three consecutive team time trial world championship victories between 2013 and 2015, and also won world titles in the individual time trial in 2014, and the mixed team relay in 2021. Brennauer also won nine national road titles during her career – five in the time trial and four in the road race – as well as several stage races such as The Women's Tour, the Holland Ladies Tour, the Grand Prix Elsy Jacobs, the Thüringen Rundfahrt der Frauen (twice) and the Challenge by La Vuelta (twice).

Major results
Source:

Road

2005
 1st  Time trial, UCI Junior World Championships
2007
 1st Weitnau Criterium
 1st Duracher-Abend-Kriterium
 1st Buchloer Citykriterium
 2nd Rosenheimer Frucade-Straßenpreis
 2nd Allgäuer Festwochenpreis Kempten
 3rd Köln-Schuld-Frechen
2008
 1st Duracher Straßenpreis
 1st Grand Prix Allgäu
 1st Günzach Criterium
 2nd Preis der Stadtsparkasse Schrobenhausen
 3rd Pinswanger Straßenrennen
 3rd Rund um den Elm
 3rd Allgäuer Festwochenpreis Kempten
 UEC European Under-23 Road Championships
4th Road race
9th Time trial
2009
 Bavaria State Road Championships
1st Road race
2nd Time trial
 1st Aichacher-Frühjahrsstraßenpreis
 2nd Overall Albstadt-Frauen-Etappenrennen
1st Stage 2
 2nd Berner Rundfahrt
 3rd Pinswanger Straßenrennen
 3rd Großer Silber Pils Preis
2011
 1st Eidsvollrittet Race 2
 1st Betten Lima Kriterium
 3rd Ronde van Goor
2012
 3rd Overall Belgium Tour
2013
 1st  Team time trial, UCI Road World Championships
 1st  Time trial, National Road Championships
 1st Open de Suède Vårgårda TTT
 1st Stage 2 (TTT) Holland Ladies Tour
 2nd Overall Belgium Tour
1st Stage 1 (TTT)
 3rd Overall Internationale Thüringen Rundfahrt der Frauen
 4th Overall Energiewacht Tour
 4th Chrono Champenois – Trophée Européen
 7th Overall Gracia-Orlová
 7th Ronde van Gelderland
 8th Overall Ladies Tour of Qatar
 8th Overall Tour Languedoc Roussillon
1st Stage 5 (ITT)
2014
 UCI Road World Championships
1st  Time trial
1st  Team time trial
2nd  Road race
 National Road Championships
1st  Time trial
1st  Road race
 1st  Overall Auensteiner-Radsporttage
1st Stages 1 (ITT) & 2
 1st Ronde van Overijssel
 1st Grand Prix Leende
 Open de Suède Vårgårda
1st Team time trial
6th Road race
 2nd Overall Holland Ladies Tour
1st  Points classification
1st Stage 2
 3rd Overall Internationale Thüringen Rundfahrt der Frauen
1st  German rider classification
1st Prologue & Stage 3 (ITT)
 4th La Course by Le Tour de France
 5th Overall Energiewacht Tour
1st Stage 3b (TTT)
 5th Sparkassen Giro
 10th Novilon EDR Cup
2015
 UCI Road World Championships
1st  Team time trial
3rd  Time trial
 1st  Overall Energiewacht Tour
1st Stage 2a (TTT)
 1st  Overall The Women's Tour
1st  Points classification
1st Stage 4
 1st  Overall Holland Ladies Tour
1st Stages 4 (ITT) & 5
 National Road Championships
2nd Time trial
3rd Road race
 Open de Suède Vårgårda
2nd Team time trial
3rd Road race
 2nd Time trial, EPZ Omloop van Borsele
 3rd Diamond Tour
 5th Overall Thüringen Rundfahrt
1st  German rider classification
1st Stages 1 & 3a (ITT)
 6th La Course by Le Tour de France
 10th Overall Gracia–Orlová
1st Stage 3 (ITT)
2016
 UCI Road World Championships
2nd  Team time trial
6th Time trial
 National Road Championships
2nd Road race
3rd Time trial
 2nd Overall Auensteiner–Radsporttage
1st Stage 1
 2nd Gent–Wevelgem
 3rd Overall Energiewacht Tour
1st  Points classification
 5th Overall Belgium Tour
 5th Chrono Champenois
 8th Time trial, Summer Olympics
 8th Overall Thüringen Rundfahrt
1st  German rider classification
 8th Overall Holland Ladies Tour
1st Stage 5
2017
 1st  Overall Internationale Thüringen Rundfahrt der Frauen
1st  German rider classification
1st Prologue
 National Road Championships
2nd Road race
2nd Time trial
 3rd Overall Healthy Ageing Tour
1st Stage 3
 3rd Tour of Flanders
 3rd Dwars door Vlaanderen
 3rd Prudential RideLondon Classique
 3rd Crescent Vårgårda UCI Women's WorldTour TTT
 3rd Race Melbourne – Albert Park
 4th Overall Holland Ladies Tour
1st  Points classification
1st Stage 4
 5th Gent–Wevelgem
2018
 1st  Time trial, National Road Championships
 1st  Overall Internationale Thüringen Rundfahrt der Frauen
1st  German rider classification
1st Stage 4
 3rd  Road race, UEC European Road Championships
 5th Three Days of Bruges–De Panne
 5th Team time trial, Crescent Vårgårda UCI Women's WorldTour
 7th Overall Madrid Challenge by La Vuelta
 8th Tour of Flanders
 10th Overall Healthy Ageing Tour
2019
 National Road Championships
1st  Road race
3rd Time trial
 1st  Overall Grand Prix Elsy Jacobs
1st  Points classification
1st Stage 2
 1st  Overall Madrid Challenge by la Vuelta
1st Stage 1 (ITT)
 1st Stage 4b Healthy Ageing Tour
 UCI Road World Championships
2nd  Mixed team relay
9th Road race
10th Time trial
 UEC European Road Championships
2nd  Team relay
7th Road race
 6th Overall Women's Tour de Yorkshire
 8th Overall Holland Ladies Tour
 8th Tour of Flanders
 9th Overall Thüringen Rundfahrt
2020
 UEC European Road Championships
1st  Mixed team relay
4th Time trial
6th Road race
 1st  Road race, National Road Championships
 1st  Overall Challenge by La Vuelta
1st  Points classification
1st Stage 2 (ITT)
 2nd Three Days of Bruges–De Panne
 3rd Gent–Wevelgem
 UCI Road World Championships
4th Time trial
9th Road race
 4th Tour of Flanders
 8th Strade Bianche
2021
 UCI Road World Championships
1st  Mixed team relay
5th Time trial
9th Road race
 National Road Championships
1st  Time trial
1st  Road race
 2nd Overall Healthy Ageing Tour
 2nd Tour of Flanders
 3rd  Time trial, UEC European Road Championships
 3rd Gent–Wevelgem
 4th Paris–Roubaix
 Olympic Games
6th Road race
6th Time trial
 7th Omloop Het Nieuwsblad
2022
 1st  Time trial, National Road Championships
 4th Road race, UEC European Road Championships

Results timelines

Track

2008
 2nd  Team pursuit, 2008–09 UCI Track Cycling World Cup Classics, Manchester
 9th Individual pursuit, UEC European Under-23 Championships
2009
 2nd  Team pursuit, 2009–10 UCI Track Cycling World Cup Classics, Manchester
 3rd  Team pursuit, 2008–09 UCI Track Cycling World Cup Classics, Copenhagen
 3rd  Team pursuit, UEC European Under-23 Championships
2010
 2nd  Team pursuit, 2010–11 UCI Track Cycling World Cup Classics, Melbourne
 2nd Individual pursuit, National Championships
 3rd  Team pursuit, UEC European Championships
2011
 National Championships
1st  Omnium
3rd Individual pursuit
 2nd  Team pursuit, UEC European Championships
 3rd  Team pursuit, 2011–12 UCI Track Cycling World Cup, Astana
 4th Omnium, 2010–11 UCI Track Cycling World Cup Classics, Manchester
2013
 1st  Individual pursuit, National Championships
2018
 UEC European Championships
1st  Individual pursuit
3rd  Team pursuit
 1st  Individual pursuit, National Championships
2019
 2nd  Individual pursuit, UCI World Championships
 Team pursuit, 2019–20 UCI Track Cycling World Cup
2nd  Minsk
2nd  Glasgow
 UEC European Championships
2nd  Individual pursuit
2nd  Team pursuit
2020
 UCI World Championships
2nd  Individual pursuit
3rd  Team pursuit
2021
 1st  Team pursuit, Olympic Games
 UCI World Championships
1st  Individual pursuit
1st  Team pursuit
 UEC European Championships
1st  Individual pursuit
1st  Team pursuit
2022
 UEC European Championships
1st  Team pursuit
2nd  Individual pursuit

References

External links
 
 
 
 
 
 
 
 

1988 births
Living people
Cyclists at the 2012 Summer Olympics
Cyclists at the 2016 Summer Olympics
Cyclists at the 2020 Summer Olympics
Olympic cyclists of Germany
German female cyclists
German track cyclists
People from Kempten im Allgäu
Sportspeople from Swabia (Bavaria)
Cyclists from Bavaria
UCI Road World Champions (women)
European Championships (multi-sport event) gold medalists
Medalists at the 2020 Summer Olympics
Olympic medalists in cycling
Olympic gold medalists for Germany
UCI Track Cycling World Champions (women)
21st-century German women